Svetlaya Rus (Bright Rus') is a Russian nationalist movement, founded in 2009 by Russian nationalist mercenary Igor Mangushev (1986–2023).

Name 
Svetlaya Rus translates as "Bright Rus'" or "Light-Skinned Rus'" in English, and is synonymous with a "mono-ethnic, neo-pagan technocratic nation state."

History and activities 
Svetlaya Rus is a Russian militia movement founded in 2009 by Russian nationalist mercenary Igor Mangushev. Leaders of the group have inclued Ivan Otrakovsky. It draws membership from the Russian Orthodox Church.

The initial activity of the organisation was a December 30, 2009 rally for recently murdered priest Daniil Sysoev. Soon after, the organisation started identifying undocumented Uzbekistan, Kyrgyzstan and Tajikistan migrants to the police. In 2011, the organisation raided Krasnaya Presnya residences in search of migrants. As the Russo-Ukrainian War started, Svetlaya Rus organised pro-Russian events in Crimea.

See also 

 Northern Brotherhood
 E.N.O.T. Corp.

References 

2009 establishments in Russia
Russian nationalist organizations
Organizations founded by Igor Mangushev